Charles Mengel (born 2 March 1933) is an Australian cricketer. He played in six first-class matches for Queensland in 1957/58.

See also
 List of Queensland first-class cricketers

References

External links
 

1933 births
Living people
Australian cricketers
Queensland cricketers
Cricketers from Brisbane